Salmone (meaning salmon in Italian) may refer to:
 Salmone (Elis), a town of ancient Elis, Greece
 Monte Salmone, a mountain in the Alps
 Cape Salmone, Crete, mentioned in the Bible in Acts 27:7
 Salmone Creek, Vancouver, Washington
 Salmone (A 5430), lead ship of the Italian Navy Classe Salmone minesweepers

See also
 Salmon (disambiguation)